TVBS Media Inc., formerly Liann Yee Production Co., Ltd., is a Taiwanese commercial television broadcasting company. It was originally established as a joint venture between TVB in Hong Kong and Era Group in Taiwan, but TVB took over Era's shares in the company in 2005. Later, TVB sold all of its shares in the company to HTC Corporation Chairwoman Cher Wang. As of 2019, TVBS operates four domestic channels and one international channel: TVBS, the flagship channel; TVBS News, 24-hour news channel; TVBS Entertainment, which shows variety and drama series; TVBS E! (formerly TVB8), an alternative channel available on CHT MOD IPTV platform; and TVBS Asia, available outside Taiwan.

History
The company's flagship channel, TVBS, began its broadcast through satellite DTH and local cable systems on 28 September 1993. The name originally stood for "TVB Superchannel", while its Chinese name was Wuhsien Weihsing Tienshiht'ai. It was originally a part of the so-called "Gang of Five", which was a consortium that was set up to compete against Star TV across Asia. (The others in the group were CNN International, HBO, ESPN International [with its Asian operations] and the Australian Broadcasting Corporation [with Australia Television International]) The consortium's channels were initially transmitted via Palapa satellite, but were later also added to Apstar satellite. TVBS later launched an international version named TVBS Asia in 1997, and TVB launched separate satellite channels that targeted East and Southeast Asia in 1998.

As the first privately owned broadcaster, it broke the decades-long oligopoly of the three state-owned terrestrial television stations in the Taiwan market.

TVBS Media was the first Taiwanese broadcasting company to go full HD, from filming to production to broadcast. It was the first to introduce 4K cameras paired with movie-quality lenses to film and produce its dramas, programs, and news special reports.

TVBS channels
TVBS operates four channels:
 TVBS
 TVBS Entertainment Channel
 TVBS-NEWS
 TVBS-Asia

Controversy
 Government Information Office (GIO) Taiwan head Pasuya Yao claims TVBS violated Taiwan media ownership laws, requiring that a foreign juristic person should not directly own majority shares of local satellite channels. On 1 November 2005, the announced a fine of NT$1 million against TVBS and ordered that it comply with the ownership rules in a practical timeframe, and afterwards TVBS appealed to Executive Yuan against Yao's decision. TVBS stated that TVB, a television broadcasting company in Hong Kong, held majority ownership of the company by a local juristic person. Executive Yuan announced that TVBS's ownership models is legal and GIO are required to return the fine.
 Bitumen duck incident (瀝青鴨事件): happened on 29 December 2006. Although TVBS apologized, the incident had already caused damage to the duck farming industry.
 Chou Cheng-pao Video Tape incident (周政保影帶事件): happened on 26 March 2007. On March 30, the NCC fined TVBS a total of two million New Taiwan dollars and required TVBS to replace the general manager.

See also
 Taiwan Major League
 TVB
 List of Taiwanese television series

References

External links

  TVBS Official Site
  TVBi
  
  The Star: “Taiwan reporters fired over TV gangster video”, 2007-03-29
  ic Wales: “Taiwanese gangster threatens to kill rival”, 2007-03-27
  Earthtimes: “Man's TV threat proves costly”, 2007-03-29

Television stations in Taiwan
Television channels and stations established in 1993
Chinese-language television stations
Companies of Taiwan
TVB
Companies based in Taipei
1993 establishments in Taiwan